Tharun Kishore Sudhir  is an Indian Kannada film actor, director.
He is known for his directorial debut film Chowka. Tharun's next project as a director was Roberrt and this film was  released on 11 March 2021. The movie has Darshan in the lead role.

Early life
Tharun Sudhir is the son of yesteryear Kannada film actor Sudhir and Malathi Sudhir. Tharun completed his studies from the KLE College. He finished his hotel management course and worked at the Ashoka Hotel for 1 year. Apart from his interest in movies, Tharun also desired to pursue a career in Cricket.

Career
Tharun Kishore Sudhir is an Indian actor, writer and director, who works predominantly in the Kannada film industry. After working as a co-director for the 2012 movie Rambo, Tharun made his directorial debut with the movie Chowka in 2017. The movie starred prominent Sandalwood actors such as Prajwal Devraj, Diganth, Prem Kumar and Vijay Raghavendra and received critical acclaim. Tharun Kishore's next project was Roberrt has Darshan in the lead and the movie was released on 11 March 2021.

Tharun has also acted in a few movies. While he made his debut as a child artist in Ganeshana Maduve, Tharun made his senior debut with the movie Excuse Me. He was also seen in movies such as Chappale, Jothe Jotheyali, Vidhyarthi, Navagraha, and Vishnu Sena.

Tharun's brother Nanda Kishore is also a Kannada movie director.

Filmography

As director

As actor

As writer

Awards and nominations

References

External links
 

Living people
Kannada film directors
Film directors from Bangalore
20th-century Indian male actors
21st-century Indian male actors
Male actors from Bangalore
Indian male film actors
Male actors in Kannada cinema
People from Bellary district
Indian male child actors
1987 births